DWMX (97.7 FM), broadcasting as Sweet Radio 97.7, is a radio station owned and operated by Soundstream Broadcasting Corporation. The station's studio and transmitter are located at the 3rd Floor, Heritage Commercial Complex, Maharlika Highway, Brgy. Malvar, Santiago, Isabela.

References

Radio stations in Isabela (province)
Radio stations established in 1996